Kalochi is a village and a community of the Grevena municipality. Before the 2011 local government reform it was a part of the municipality of Grevena, of which it was a municipal district. The 2011 census recorded 31 residents in the village and 106 residents in the community. The community of Kalochi covers an area of 37.062 km2.

Administrative division
The community of Kalochi consists of three separate settlements: 
Agapi (population 26)
Kalochi (population 31)
Mesolakkos (population 49)
The aforementioned population figures are as of 2011.

Population
According to the 2011 census, the population of the settlement of Kalochi was 31 people, a decrease of almost 66% compared to the previous census of 2001.

See also
 List of settlements in the Grevena regional unit

References

Populated places in Grevena (regional unit)
Villages in Greece